J.-E. Bernard Pilon (1 August 1918 – 17 November 1970) was a Canadian insurance broker and politician. Pilon served as a Liberal party member of the House of Commons of Canada. He was born in Vaudreuil, Quebec.

He was first elected at the Chambly—Rouville riding in the 1962 general election, then re-elected there in the 1963 and 1965 federal elections. For the 1968 federal election, riding boundaries were realigned and Pilon was a candidate at the Chambly electoral district.

Pilon died in Montreal on 17 November 1970 due to a heart attack before completing his term in the 28th Canadian Parliament.

References

External links
 

1918 births
1970 deaths
Members of the House of Commons of Canada from Quebec
Liberal Party of Canada MPs